The province of Pisa is a province in the Tuscany region of central Italy. Its capital is the city of Pisa. It is subdivided into 37 comuni.

With a history that dates to the Etruscans and Phoenicians, the province achieved considerable power and influence in the Mediterranean in the 12th and 13th centuries. Pisa, the provincial capital, is known for its Leaning Tower, and other historic landmarks that attract tourists.

History
The area has a long maritime history dating back to the Etruscans, the Phoenicians and the Gauls. Under the Roman Empire, it was responsible for naval battles against the Ligurians, Gauls and Carthaginians, becoming a Roman colony in 180 B.C. and gaining further colonial independence under Julius Caesar. Thanks to its complex river system, with the fall of the Roman Empire, Pisa did not suffer unduly and was able to combat Saracen pirates. In 828, it launched an expedition against the north African coast while in 871, Pisan troops helped to defend Salerno from the Moors.

In the 11th century, Pisa became a republic, reaching its zenith in the 12th and 13th centuries when its navy controlled the western Mediterranean. As a Maritime Republic, its power extended well beyond the Italian peninsula. After first being an ally then a rival of the Republic of Genoa, it suffered defeat at the Battle of Meloria in 1284. As a result, it began to decline and in 1406 was annexed to Florence, becoming part of the Grand Duchy of Tuscany in the 16th century. In the 20th century, Pisa was hit hard by allied bombing and Nazi reprisals.

The current province descends from the Grand Duchy, while its territories are part of the former Maritime Republic of Pisa. In 1925, the municipalities of Bibbona, Campiglia Marittima, Castagneto Carducci, Cecina, Collesalvetti, Piombino, Rosignano Marittimo, Sassetta, and Suvereto were transferred to the Province of Livorno, and at the same time the municipalities of Castelfranco di Sotto, Montopoli in Val d'Arno, San Miniato, Santa Croce sull'Arno, and Santa Maria a Monte were acquired by the Province of Florence. In 1938, the comune of Castellina Marittima bought a small slice of the territory of the municipality of Cecina, part of the province of Livorno, which was attributed to an administrative error.

Geography

Pisa Province extends from the alluvial plain of the Arno River, in western Tuscany, to the Ligurian Sea and has the shape of a gun upside down. It is bordered to the north by the Province of Lucca, to the east by the Metropolitan City of Florence and Province of Siena, to the south by Province of Grosseto, and to the west by the Province of Livorno and the Ligurian Sea. The province contains 39 comuni (municipalities). The most populous cities in the province as of 2013 are Pisa (86,494), Cascina (44,040), San Giuliano Terme (31,039), Pontedera (28,793), San Miniato (27,580), Ponsacco (15,503).

The northern area is mountainous, containing the Apennine mountain range of Mount Pisano, adjacent to the extreme offshoot of the Apuan Alps, that separates the province of Pisa from Lucca. The highest point of Monte Pisano range and of the province is at Monte Serra. The area of Pisa is flat, but, a few miles further south, in the southern part of the province, is classic Tuscan landscape consisting of hills, forests and ancient villages. Of particular note in the south is the Val di Cecina, the valley of the Cecina River, and the ancient city of Volterra to the west. The southern area of the province is hilly, containing the peak of Monte Aia dei Diavoli (867m).

Demography
Statistics recorded since 1861 show that the population of the province has increased gradually, from 240,000 is the 1860s to c. 390,000 in the 1990s. Since the new millennium, it has increased by some 30,000 to over 420,000 today.

As of 1 January 2014, the ten most populated municipalities were Pisa (88,627), Cascina (44,901), San Giuliano Terme (31,315), Pontedera (28,915), San Miniato (28,072), Ponsacco (15,609), Santa Croce sull'Arno (14,528), Castelfranco di Sotto (13,431), Santa Maria a Monte (13,197) and Casciana Terme Lari (12,536),

Economy
The Province of Pisa has a wide variety of companies and organisations in the public and private sectors. One of the main areas of production is leather and footwear, where some 800 enterprises employing about 10,000 workers manufacture 35% of the Italy's total output in the sector. Since 2003, clothing has also been under development. There are also a number of enterprises in the chemical sector, while pharmaceuticals are also a strong sector. Catalysed by the CNR national research authority, facilities have been developed in Cascina, Pontedera, Santa Croce and Peccioli. There are also a number of software development firms and IT consultancies. While in recent years the economic crisis has reduced activities in most areas, agriculture had continued to grow, thanks to traditional crops, wine production and diversification in the fruit and vegetables sector. Other sectors that have recently prospered include technology (+3.4%) and glass (+4.5%) while there have been drops in footwear (-3.1%), metals (-2%), electronics and transport equipment (-9.7%), construction (-7.8%) and manufacturing (-8.2%).

Tourism is also an important contributor to the local economy but in 2013 it suffered from a reduction of 10.7% in the number of visitors to the province, with a reduction of 3.5% in nights spent in hotels.

Government

Comuni

The province is subdivided into 37 comuni (singular: comune). This is the complete list of comuni in the province of Pisa:

 Bientina
 Buti
 Calci
 Calcinaia
 Capannoli
 Casale Marittimo
 Casciana Terme Lari
 Cascina
 Castelfranco di Sotto
 Castellina Marittima
 Castelnuovo di Val di Cecina
 Chianni
 Crespina Lorenzana
 Fauglia
 Guardistallo
 Lajatico
 Montecatini Val di Cecina
 Montescudaio
 Monteverdi Marittimo
 Montopoli in Val d'Arno
 Orciano Pisano
 Palaia
 Peccioli
 Pisa
 Pomarance
 Ponsacco
 Pontedera
 Riparbella
 San Giuliano Terme
 San Miniato
 Santa Croce sull'Arno
 Santa Luce
 Santa Maria a Monte
 Terricciola
 Vecchiano
 Vicopisano
 Volterra

List of presidents of the province of Pisa

Main sights
In addition to the many sights in the city of Pisa (the Leaning Tower, the cathedral and the Carovana Palace), the province has many attractions in its other towns and villages. The historic city of Volterra is noted for its cathedral, its Etruscan and Roman remains and its museums, churches and palaces.

Set on the top of three hills, the medieval city of San Miniato has a cathedral, a fortress tower, two palaces and numerous old churches.

The province has many villages of interest, including Vicopisano with its fortress and towers, Calci with its Charterhouse (now a museum), and Buti with its castle and Medici villa.

Other points of interest include the Villa di Corliano in San Giuliano Terme, the gated medieval village of Castelfranco di Sotto, the towers of Montopoli in Val d'Arno, the bell-tower of Peccioli, and the Rocca Sillana fortress in Pomarance.

References

External links

 Province homepage 
 Itineraries in Pisa - not only the city of the Leaning Tower

 
P
Pisa